Antonio Oseguera Cervantes (born 20 August 1958) is a Mexican suspected drug lord and former high-ranking leader of the Jalisco New Generation Cartel (CJNG), a criminal group based in Jalisco. His brother is Nemesio Oseguera Cervantes (alias "El Mencho"), the leader of the CJNG and one of Mexico's most-wanted drug lords. In Mexico, he was formally charged in 2015 for drug trafficking and being in possession of military-exclusive firearms.

On 3 December 2015, Oseguera Cervantes was arrested while driving in Tlajomulco, Jalisco. He was imprisoned at the Federal Social Readaptation Center No. 11, a maximum-security prison in Sonora. The following year, the United States Department of the Treasury sanctioned him under the Foreign Narcotics Kingpin Designation Act for providing financial and material assistance to the CJNG. A judge later released him from prison after determining that there were violations in his due process. He would again be arrested on 20 December 2022.

Early life and career
Antonio Oseguera Cervantes was born on 10 August 1958, in Aguililla, Michoacán, Mexico. He uses another formal name, Joel Mora Garibay, and often goes by his alias "Tony Montana". He reportedly has five brothers: Nemesio, Juan, Miguel, Marín, and Abraham. His criminal background dates back to the 1990s. In 1996, Oseguera Cervantes was arrested for heroin charges in the U.S. and deported to Mexico, where he renewed his drug trafficking activities. Several of his siblings were also accused of heroin distribution or other crimes in the U.S. that decade. In 2001, Oseguera Cervantes was released from a prison in Mississippi after being convicted for property damage.

His brother Nemesio (alias "El Mencho") is the leader of the Jalisco New Generation Cartel (CJNG) and one of Mexico's most-wanted drug lords. Under his sibling, Oseguera Cervantes was responsible for supervising the buying and selling of firearms for the CJNG. He was also responsible for managing money laundering schemes and passing on information of law enforcement activities to the CJNG. According to Mexican security forces, he mostly coordinated the CJNG operations while based in the Guadalajara Metropolitan Area.

On 27 October 2016, the United States Department of the Treasury sanctioned nine Mexican nationals, including Oseguera Cervantes, under the Foreign Narcotics Kingpin Designation Act (also known as the "Kingpin Act") for their alleged involvement in money laundering and/or international drug trafficking. They were accused of providing financial and material assistance to his brother Nemesio and his in-law Abigael González Valencia (alias "El Cuini"), the two leaders of the CJNG and Los Cuinis. As a result of this sanction, Oseguera Cervantes' assets in the U.S. were frozen and U.S. citizens were prohibited from carrying out transactions with him; the other individuals sanctioned were Julio Alberto Castillo Rodríguez; González Valencia clan members Arnulfo, Édgar Edén, Marisa Ivette, Noemi, and Elvis; businessman Fabián Felipe Vera López and attorney María Teresa Quintana Navarro.

2015 arrest
On 3 December 2015, Oseguera Cervantes was driving in Tlajomulco, Jalisco, when he noticed the presence of the Federal Police and the Mexican Army. As he tried to avoid passing through them at a checkpoint near his home, the officers ordered him to stop. The police had followed his tracks for six months and knew that he was trying to live under a low profile to avoid the detection of law enforcement. Oseguera Cervantes was driving a 2010 Volkswagen Jetta, was not accompanied by a bodyguard, and claimed to be a clothing merchant. He identified himself using an ID with his other alias, Joel Mora Garibay. The police arrested him and seized his vehicle, two assault rifles, a handgun, and a package with an undisclosed amount of narcotics. The Federal Police chief  confirmed his arrest the following day in a press conference. He stated that Oseguera Cervantes was a high-ranking leader of the CJNG and that his arrest was a major blow to the group's financial circle.

Imprisonment and release 
On 4 December, he was transferred to Mexico City and sent to the SEIDO installations, Mexico's anti-organized crime investigatory agency, for his legal declaration. On 7 December, he was sent to the Federal Social Readaptation Center No. 11, a maximum-security prison in Hermosillo, Sonora. The Office of the General Prosecutor (PGR) confirmed that he was charged with drug trafficking and possession of military-exclusive firearms. A federal court in Jalisco confirmed the charges on 15 December after it concluded that the PGR provided sufficient evidences against him. The court also specified that Oseguera Cervantes was found in possession of methamphetamine (1000.1 grams) with intent to distribute.

On 18 December, Oseguera Cervantes' defense issued a writ of amparo to an appeal court in Mexico City and requested them to remove his charges. The court investigated the injuries he had after he was arrested, and analyzed whether he was tortured to confess or if they were a result of him resisting arrest. The court struck the injunction after it considered that the charges against him were serious in nature and that the arrest was lawful.

On 15 July 2016, an appeal court in Jalisco granted Oseguera Cervantes a writ of amparo after it discovered that he was formally charged with drug trafficking and possession of military-exclusive weapons without a required signature by a judge in one of the documents used in the case. The unsigned court document contained information about fingerprint evidence that linked Oseguera Cervantes to the weapons and drugs seized at the moment of his arrest. It also included information of the defense's vehicle and his mental and behavioral exams conducted by criminal investigators. The appeal court stated that the lack of signature affected Oseguera Cervantes' legal representation and thus constituted a violation in the legal process. This pushed back the case against Oseguera Cervantes to its initial stages. He was later released from prison after a judge considered that there were violations in his due process.

2022 arrest
On 20 December 2022, Oseguera Cervantes was captured while in possession of weapons in a suburb of Guadalajara. Authorities said he oversaw violent actions and logistics, and bought weapons and laundered money for the cartel.

See also
Mexican Drug War

Sources
Footnotes

References

External links

Jalisco New Generation Cartel – InSight Crime
CJNG and Los Cuinis, Organizational Chart – United States Department of the Treasury

Living people
1958 births
People from Michoacán
People from Guadalajara, Jalisco 
Jalisco New Generation Cartel
People sanctioned under the Foreign Narcotics Kingpin Designation Act
Mexican drug traffickers
Mexican crime bosses
Mexican money launderers 
People deported from the United States
People of the Mexican Drug War